Octavio Cortázar Jiménez (19 January 1935 – 27 February 2008) was a Cuban film director and screenwriter. He directed twelve films between 1961 and 2005. His 1977 film The Teacher was entered into the 28th Berlin International Film Festival, where it won the Silver Bear for an outstanding artistic contribution. His 1981 film Guardafronteras was entered into the 12th Moscow International Film Festival.

Cortázar died of a heart attack while visiting Madrid on 27 February 2008 at the age of 73.

Selected filmography
 For the First Time (1967)
 The Teacher (1977)
 Guardafronteras (1981)
 La Ultima Rumba de Papa Montero (1992)

References

External links

1935 births
2008 deaths
Cuban film directors
Cuban screenwriters
Cuban male writers
Male screenwriters
20th-century screenwriters